Boyuk Mammad oghlu Aghayev (December 10, 1907 — October 18, 1965) was an Azerbaijani doctor and statesman, Minister of Health of the Azerbaijan SSR (1958–1963), Rector of the Azerbaijan State Institute for the Advancement of Doctors (1963–1965).

Biography 
Boyuk Aghayev was born in 1907 in the city of Shusha. At the age of 14, he entered the Shusha Teachers Seminary and after five years he started teaching in one of the rural schools of Shemakha uezd. Later, he worked as an inspector of public education department of Shirvan district, head of public education department of Gutgashen district. In the same years, he received higher pedagogical education by correspondence and graduated from the Azerbaijan Pedagogical Institute in 1935, and in 1942 he graduated from the Faculty of Treatment and Prevention of the Azerbaijan State Medical Institute.

After finishing his education, Boyuk Aghayev worked as a doctor-malariologist at the sanatorium-epidemiological station in Goychay, and became the head of the tropical station in Kurdamir. In 1948–1953, he worked as the chief supervisor of the Ministry of State Control of the Azerbaijan SSR, from April 1953 as the Deputy Minister of Health of the Azerbaijan SSR, and from February 1958 as the Minister of Health of the Azerbaijan SSR. From May 1963 until the end of his life, he was the director of the Azerbaijan State Institute for the Advancement of Doctors.

Boyuk Aghayev, who was admitted to the membership of the Communist Party of Azerbaijan since 1942, was a candidate for the membership of the Central Committee of the Communist Party of Azerbaijan. He was elected a deputy of the 5th convocation of the Supreme Soviet of the Azerbaijan SSR, as well as of the Baku City Council of Working People's Deputies. He was awarded the Order of Lenin (1961) and medals of the USSR.

Boyuk Aghayev died in 1965 in Baku.

References

External links 
 
 

1907 births
1965 deaths
Burials at Alley of Honor
Azerbaijan Communist Party (1920) politicians
Recipients of the Order of Lenin
Azerbaijan State Pedagogical University alumni
Azerbaijan Medical University alumni